Mehmet Nas (born 20 November 1979) is a Turkish professional footballer. who plays as a midfielder for Sivas Belediyespor.

Club career
Nas began his professional career in 1998. He spent six years with Samsunspor before he moved on to capital club Gençlerbirliği in 2004. After making 132 appearances and scoring six goals for the Ankara-based club, he moved to Manisaspor in 2009. He spent one season at the club before moving to Sivasspor in 2010.

International career
Nas was first called up to the Turkey national under-21 football team in 1998. He made 22 appearances for the team between 1998 and 2001.

See also
Mehmet Nas: "Futbolcu olmasaydım lokantacı olacaktım"  – An extensive interview with the Turkish Football Federation website.

References

1979 births
Living people
People from Kelkit
Turkish footballers
Turkey under-21 international footballers
Süper Lig players
TFF First League players
Samsunspor footballers
Gençlerbirliği S.K. footballers
Manisaspor footballers
Sivasspor footballers
Elazığspor footballers
Gaziantep F.K. footballers
Association football midfielders